The Bărbat is a left tributary of the river Strei in Romania. It discharges into the Strei in Pui.

Tributaries
The following rivers are tributaries to the river Bărbat:

Left: Murgușa, Sohodol
Right: Tulișa

References

Rivers of Romania
Rivers of Hunedoara County